Rollover is a 1981 American political thriller film directed by Alan J. Pakula and starring Jane Fonda and Kris Kristofferson. The film was nominated for a Razzie Award for Worst Actor for Kristofferson.

Plot
Lee Winters (Fonda) is the widow of the Chairman and primary stockholder of Winterchem Enterprises, a chemical company, who is attempting to obtain financing of the purchase of a processing plant in Spain, while trying to determine why her husband was murdered.

Apparently, her late husband discovered some damning information about an Account Number 21214, a secret slush fund involving asset transfers.

Respected financier Hubbell Smith (Kristofferson) takes over as president of Borough National Bank at the request of First New York Bank chairman Maxwell Emery (Cronyn), in an attempt to have Smith discover the financial status of Borough National.

Smith discovers that the bank isn't just in trouble, it's essentially so insolvent that it can't even pay its next dividend.  It needs to find a customer who needs to borrow a lot of money and either loan the money or act as broker in the deal in order to raise some quick cash and stave off intervention by the Federal Reserve.

One of the largest customers of Borough National is Winterchem, but because of federal lending limits, the bank "can't loan them a dime" but conceivably could be involved in brokering a deal between Winterchem and some other lender capable of loaning the approximately $500 million needed to buy the plant, and the bank would receive a 1% finder's fee for making the arrangement.  Later there are tense moments when Borough National are waiting for Arab oil money deposits to be renewed in a "roll over".  The bank would be unable to refund the deposits, but at the last minute the roll over occurs, except for some money diverted to account 21214.

Smith becomes involved, both financially and romantically, with Winters in her attempts to finance the purchase of the petrochemical plant and in the discovery of the mystery of account 21214. They finally do so by brokering a deal with some Arab investors who take control of her stock as security for the transaction.

Smith later discovers that account 21214 is actually a slush fund where Emery is moving money belonging to the Arabs into gold as a safe haven against potential losses if the dollar collapses. The Arabs are extremely worried that if anyone finds out, their assets will vanish in a public panic as American currency becomes worthless.

Winters also discovers the Arabs are behind account 21214, and wants her stock back in exchange for her silence; she has overheard part of Smith's conversation with Emery and mistakenly believes he was double-crossing her. A fake limo driver who is actually working for the Arab investors tries to kidnap her with the intent of killing her—as it turns out they did to her husband—to prevent her from disclosing what she knows, and when the attempt on her life fails, the Arabs panic and pull all of their money out of every bank in America, and possibly the entire world.

The globe is gripped by panic and rioting as people discover all of their money is now worthless. Emery is shown in his office - dead, an apparent suicide.  The economic crisis paralyzes the world, but by spilling over boundaries between east and west blocs, and between developing and industrialized nations, it also unites the world in common cause.  In the penultimate scene, workers at Borough National stand idle while listening to a report of the growing economic crisis.  As the camera pans across the trading floor of the bank, the viewer sees that it's now empty of workers, the lights off, the desks and machines covered - completely inactive.  Only Smith remains.  Winters joins him in the final scene.  Smith tells her that he's looking for a way to start anew.  Winters offers to become his partner.

Cast
 Jane Fonda as Lee Winters
 Kris Kristofferson as Hubbell Smith
 Hume Cronyn as Maxwell Emery
 Josef Sommer as Roy Lefcourt
 Bob Gunton as Naftari

Reception
The film opened the same weekend as Buddy Buddy and finished at number one with a gross of $2,260,889 and went on to gross $10,851,261 in the United States and Canada.

References

External links
 
 
 
 

1980s thriller drama films
American business films
American political drama films
Economics in fiction
Films set in Saudi Arabia
Films set in New York City
American political thriller films
Films about businesspeople
Films directed by Alan J. Pakula
Orion Pictures films
Warner Bros. films
Films shot in New York City
Wall Street films
Films scored by Michael Small
1981 drama films
1981 films
1980s English-language films
1980s American films